The Assyria Liberation Party or Gabo D'Furqono D'Othur (GFA, in Syriac: ܓܒܐ ܕܦܘܪܩܢܐ ܕܐܬܘܪ) was founded in 1995, and since 1997 the party has published the magazine Furqono (Liberation,ܦܘܪܩܢܐ). The party is founded on the principles of Assyrian nationalism and the creation of an independent, sovereign state for Assyrians incorporating parts of southeastern Turkey, northeastern Syria and northern Iraq. The party's main support comes from Assyrian emigrants in Europe, Australia and United States.

External links
GFA Assyria Liberation Party - Official site

Assyrian nationalism
Assyrian political parties
National liberation movements
Political parties of minorities in Iraq